Garage Project is an independent New Zealand brewery based in Aro Valley, Wellington. The brewery was founded in 2011 by brothers Ian and Pete Gillespie and Jos Ruffell, who transformed a dilapidated car garage to begin brewing 50 litres at a time- 24 new beers in 24 weeks. The 24/24 project produced many beers that are still in production- Aro Noir, Pernicious Weed, Venusian Pale Ale, Cockswain's Courage, Hāpi Daze, Biére de Garage, Red Rocks, Golden Brown, Day of Dead, Hellbender, Summer Sommer, and Rum & Raisin. 

To date the brewery has created over 300 different beers.

The brewery has grown considerably since 2011, winning the Deloitte Fast 50 in 2015 with over 660% annual growth, and distribution in New Zealand, Australia, Norway, Sweden and California. 

Garage Project established a Cellar Door and Taproom in their Aro Valley, Wellington site, a mixed fermentation and barrel location in central Wellington dubbed the "Wild Workshop", and most recently a Cellar Door in Kingsland, Auckland. In 2017 Garage Project announced a partnership with brew house bStudio in the Hawkes Bay.

Garage Project has won numerous awards- In the 2018 GABS Hottest 100 Kiwi Craft Beers poll, Garage Project claimed 19 spots, including #2 for Death from Above, #3 for Pernicious Weed, and #5 for Party & Bullshit. They were named NZ Brewery of the Year in 2017 by the New Zealand Brewers Guild Awards, edging out 111 other breweries and claiming 26 medals.

In 2017 Garage Project announced they would also begin production of natural wines called GP Crushed, made at their central Wellington location. The initial launch features four wines: a Riesling bottled mid-fermentation and spiked with Lactobacillus, a 100% Brettanomyces fermented New Zealand Chardonnay, a Pinot Noir that has undergone carbonic maceration before being spiked with Brett, and a Sauvignon/Semillon blend that has been bottled pét-nat. More wild wines are due to be released in 2018.

Hāpi Daze pale ale is served aboard Singapore Airlines flights to and from New Zealand.

References

External links

2011 establishments in New Zealand
Breweries of New Zealand